Adetus pusillus is a species of beetle in the family Cerambycidae. It was described by Fairmaire and Germain in 1859.

References

Adetus
Beetles described in 1859